Starship Traveller is a single-player adventure gamebook written by Steve Jackson and illustrated by Peter Andrew Jones. Originally published by Puffin Books in 1983, the title is the fourth gamebook in the Fighting Fantasy series. It was later republished by Wizard Books in 2002. A digital version developed by Tin Man Games is available for Android, iOS, Windows 10, MacOS, and Linux.

Rules

This adventure was the first Fighting Fantasy title with a science fiction setting. It was the first title to introduce rules for (phaser) gun combat and (ship-to-ship) spaceship combat, in addition to hand-to-hand combat. The player must also manage the statistics of multiple characters (Captain and crew) and the vessel itself. It is also possible to finish the adventure without having engaged in combat at all.

Story
Starship Traveller is a science-fiction scenario in which the hero is the captain of the starship Traveller that has been sucked through a black hole, called the Selstian Void, into another universe; to find the necessary coordinates to travel back to the safety of Earth in their own universe, the captain and a landing party must beam down to various planets in search of clues.

Reception
Marcus L. Rowland reviewed Starship Traveller for the January 1984 issue of White Dwarf, rating the title a 9 out of a possible 10. Rowland noted that this book was "apparently inspired by Star Trek," and that possible events in the game include "capture for gladitorial games, plague, summary execution as an illegal alien, and mutiny".

In other media
A digital version developed by Tin Man Games is available for Android, iOS, Windows 10, MacOS, and Linux.

References

External links
Fighting Fantasy Gamebooks - the official website
 Wizard Books - the Publisher's site

1983 fiction books
Books by Steve Jackson (British game designer)
Fighting Fantasy gamebooks
Space opera gamebooks